The 1986–87 Washington Capitals season was the Washington Capitals 13th season in the National Hockey League (NHL).

Offseason

Regular season

Final standings

Schedule and results

Playoffs

The 1987 playoff Capitals run was best known for the Easter Epic, when the Caps played the longest game 7 in their franchise history through four overtime periods. Unfortunately, they lost to the New York Islanders 3–2 in that game seven and lost the series 4–3.

Player statistics

Regular season
Scoring

Goaltending

Playoffs
Scoring

Goaltending

Note: GP = Games played; G = Goals; A = Assists; Pts = Points; +/- = Plus/minus; PIM = Penalty minutes; PPG=Power-play goals; SHG=Short-handed goals; GWG=Game-winning goals
      MIN=Minutes played; W = Wins; L = Losses; T = Ties; GA = Goals against; GAA = Goals against average; SO = Shutouts; SA=Shots against; SV=Shots saved; SV% = Save percentage;

Awards and records

Transactions

Draft picks
Washington's draft picks at the 1986 NHL Entry Draft held at the Montreal Forum in Montreal, Quebec.

Farm teams

See also
 1986–87 NHL season

References

External links
 

Wash
Wash
Washington Capitals seasons
Washing
Washing